Faisal Akef Al-Fayez  (born 20 December 1952 in Amman) is a Jordanian politician who was the 34th Prime Minister of Jordan from 25 October 2003 to 6 March 2005. He took office following the resignation of Ali Abu al-Ragheb. He resigned after being criticized for not being reformist enough. He previously served as defence minister and is close to the king. He was educated at the College De La Salle, Amman, Jordan (1970) and then went on to Cardiff University, United Kingdom, where he received a degree in political science in 1978. In 1981, he has a master's degree in international relations from Boston University.

Political experience
Al-Fayez was Consul at the Embassy of Jordan in Brussels from 1979 until 1983. He then held the post of Assistant Chief of Royal Protocol at the Royal Court from February 1986 until 1995, when he was promoted to Deputy Chief of Royal Protocol at the Royal Court. Four years later, in 1999, he became Chief of Royal Protocol at the Royal Court.

In March 2003, Al-Fayez was appointed Minister of the Royal Hashemite Court. He subsequently served as Speaker of the House of Representatives in the 16th Parliament of Jordan in 2010. He has served as member of the Senate from 2007, and once again from 2013. He was appointed President of the Senate on 25 October 2015, replacing Abdelraouf al-Rawabdeh in that position. Al-Fayez was again appointed as the President of the Senate on September 27th, 2020 by royal decree.

Prime Minister (2003-2005)
In a royal letter of designation, Al-Fayez was tasked with acting on domestic, social, and economic reforms. This included increasing the level of freedom of the press and the public, social issues such as women and youth issues, and the lowering of the unemployment levels. Al-Fayez would trim down the cabinet from 29 members to 21, and his government would be the first in Jordanian history to have three women Cabinet Ministers. 

In 2004, Al-Fayez's economic reforms helped increase Jordan's GDP per capita by 9.17%, the largest increase in GDP per capita in one year for Jordan's economy since 1992.

In January of that year, signed the multinational agreement for the second phase of the Arab Gas Pipeline, the second phase was focused on extending the pipeline from Jordan's southern border in Aqaba to it's northern border at Rehab at a total cost of $350 million, bringing the total cost of the project to $1.2 billion. Al-Fayez signed the agreement alongside Rafiq Al-Hariri, Atef Obeid, and Mohammad Al Otari.

Awards 
Faisal Al-Fayez has received a number of Jordanian decorations throughout his career:

In 1987, he was named Officer of the Order of Order of Independence (Order of Al-Istiqlal), and was promoted to the rank of Grand Officer in 1995.

In 2000, he received the Grand Cordon of the Order of the Star of Jordan (Order of Al-Kawkab Al-Urduni).

Personal life
Al-Fayez was born in Amman to Akef Al-Fayez. He is married and has three children.

See also
 List of prime ministers of Jordan
Akef Al-Fayez
 Mithqal Al Fayez
 Al-Fayez

References

External links
 Prime Ministry of Jordan website

1952 births
Living people
Faisal
Prime Ministers of Jordan
Alumni of Cardiff University
Boston University College of Arts and Sciences alumni
Jordanian Muslims
People from Amman
Defence ministers of Jordan
Jordanian diplomats
Members of the Senate of Jordan
Presidents of the Senate of Jordan
Members of the House of Representatives (Jordan)
Speakers of the House of Representatives (Jordan)